Keith Baker (15 October 1956 – 2013) was an English professional footballer who played as a goalkeeper.

References

1956 births
2013 deaths
Footballers from Oxford
English footballers
England schools international footballers
Association football goalkeepers
Oxford United F.C. players
Grimsby Town F.C. players
Millwall F.C. players
Witney Town F.C. players
Aylesbury United F.C. players
Banbury United F.C. players
Buckingham Town F.C. players
English Football League players